John Rogers may refer to:

Politics

United Kingdom
 John Rogers (died 1565) (before 1507–1565), English MP for Dorset, 1545–1559
 John Rogers II (died 1611/12), MP for Canterbury
 John Rogers (1750–1832), British MP for West Looe, Penryn and Helston
 Sir John Rogers, 1st Baronet (1649–1710), English MP for Plymouth 1698–1700
 Sir John Rogers, 2nd Baronet (1676–1744), British MP for Plymouth 1713–1722
 Sir John Rogers, 3rd Baronet (1708–1773), British MP for Plymouth 1739–1740
 Sir John Rogers, 6th Baronet (1780–1847), British MP for Callington
 John Jope Rogers (1816–1880), British barrister, author and MP for Helston

United States
 John Rogers (Continental Congress) (1723–1789), delegate to Continental Congress
 John Sill Rogers (1796–1860), American politician
 John Rogers (New York politician) (1813–1879), US Congressman from New York
 John Rankin Rogers (1838–1901), Governor of Washington, 1897
 John Henry Rogers (1845–1911), US Representative and judge from Arkansas
 John Jacob Rogers (1881–1925), Massachusetts Congressman, 1913–1925
 John Rogers (Alabama politician) (born 1940), Alabama State Representative
 John C. Rogers (born 1960), former Deputy Assistant Secretary
 John H. Rogers (born 1964), Massachusetts state representative
 John Rogers (Ohio politician), Ohio state representative
 John Rogers (Cherokee chief), last elected Principal Chief of the Cherokee Nation West

Elsewhere
 John Warrington Rogers (1822–1906), MP and judge in Tasmania, Australia
 John Rogers (Australian politician) (1842–1908)
 John Rogers (Irish lawyer) (born 1947), Attorney General of Ireland, 1984–1987

Religion
 John Rogers (Bible editor and martyr) (c. 1500–1555), editor and translator of the Matthew Bible
 John Rogers (died 1636), Puritan lecturer of Dedham, Essex
 John Rogers (Fifth Monarchist) (1627–?), minister and physician
 John Rogers (priest, born 1679) (1679–1729), English controversialist
 John Rogers (divine) (1778–1856), clergyman and writer
 John Rogers (dean of Llandaff) (born 1934), Dean of Llandaff Cathedral in Wales
 John Rogers (archdeacon of Leicester) (1648–1715), Anglican priest in England

Sports

Cricket
 John Rogers (cricketer, born 1858) (1858–1935), Australian cricketer for Victoria
 John Rogers (cricketer, born 1860) (1860–?), English cricketer for Middlesex
 John Rogers (cricketer, born 1910) (1910–1968), English first-class cricketer
 John Rogers (cricketer, born 1943), Australian cricketer for New South Wales, see Chris Rogers
 John Rogers (cricketer, born 1987), Australian cricketer for Tasmania, Western Australia

Other sports
 John Rogers (rugby union) (1867–1922), England international rugby union player
 John Rogers (baseball) (1844–1910), owner of the Philadelphia Phillies
 John Rogers, Irish footballer for Shelbourne FC, brother of Eamonn Rogers
 John Rogers (footballer) (born 1950), English footballer
 John Rogers (ice hockey, born 1953), Canadian ice hockey player
 John Rogers (ice hockey, born 1910) (1910–?), British ice hockey player
 John Rogers (rower) (1930–2016), Australian Olympic rower
 John T. Rogers (coach), Temple University coach
 John Rogers (American football center) (1910–1968), American football player

Other
 John Rogers (Harvard) (1630–1684), president of Harvard University
 John Haney Rogers (1822–1906), pioneer in the California Gold Rush of 1849
 John Rogers (sculptor) (1829–1904), sculptor from Salem, Massachusetts
 John Rogers (actor) (1888–1963) British actor
 John M. Rogers (born 1948), US federal judge on the Court of Appeals for the Sixth Circuit
 John T. Rogers (journalist) (1881–1937), journalist for the St. Louis Post-Dispatch
 John Rogers (naturalist) (1807–1867), English barrister and gardener
 John Rogers (RAF officer) (1928–2021), British air marshal
 John Daniel Rogers (born 1954), curator of archaeology at the National Museum of Natural History
 John W. Rogers Sr., American attorney and military aviator
 John W. Rogers Jr. (born 1958), his son, American investor
 John F. W. Rogers (born 1956), Goldman Sachs partner
 John A. Rogers (born 1967), physical chemist at the University of Illinois at Urbana-Champaign
 John Rogers (writer), screenwriter, comics writer, film producer
 John Rogers (businessman) (?–2018), Canadian-born American businessman and executive
 John Rogers (academic) (1651–1703), English academic
 John Rogers (Albemarle County, Virginia) (died 1838), overseer of three plantations

See also
 Johnny Rogers (disambiguation)
 John Rodgers (disambiguation)
 Jon Rogers (disambiguation)
 John Roger (disambiguation)
 Jack Rogers (disambiguation)